The Oldsmobile Model A was a passenger car manufactured by Oldsmobile for 1907 and it replaced the Model S while it was replaced by the Model M.

The engine power was transmitted to the rear wheels via a three-speed gearbox with a gearshift lever on the outside right. The brake pedal worked on the driveshaft, and the handbrake lever on the drum brakes on the rear wheels. Bodystyles offered were a 4-door touring car or a 4-door sedan. The touring car was available in gray, red and Brewster green, while the sedans were available in dark green or black, while either body style had a retail price of US$2,750 ($ in  dollars ). The standard items available with a full set of tools, two acetylene headlights, two additional oil lamps, a speaking tube for communicating with the driver, perfumery bottles, ashtray and silk trim for the passenger compartment

The Model A shared much of its mechanicals and chassis with the Model H "Flying Roadster" also listed at US$2,750, available in either red or French gray.

References

Model A